Tours Duo are two skyscrapers designed by Jean Nouvel and located in the 13th arrondissement of Paris, on the edge of the ring road and Ivry-sur-Seine. As of 2022, most of their surface is occupied by the group headquarters of banking group BPCE.

The mixed-use project covers more than 108,000 m2. It mainly houses offices but also a hotel, a restaurant, a bar with a panoramic terrace overlooking Paris, an auditorium, shops and green terraces.

The Tour Duo n°1, with 180 m, is the third tallest building in Paris after the Eiffel Tower (324 m) and the Tour Montparnasse (209 m), at par with the forthcoming Tour Triangle. The whole is intended to complete the "belt" formed by several towers and high-rise buildings at the gates of Paris.

Work began at the end of March 2017, and the two completed towers were delivered in 2021.

See also 
 List of tallest buildings and structures in the Paris region
 List of tallest buildings in France

References

External links 
 Tours Duo

Duo
13th arrondissement of Paris
Skyscrapers in Paris
Office buildings completed in 2021
21st-century architecture in France